Sofi Diyalowai (born 14 October 1993) is a Fijian footballer who plays as a midfielder for Labasa FC and the Fiji women's national team.

Diyalowai is from Natokalau in Ba. She started playing football in 2009, and became a referee in 2016. In 2013 she won the Fiji FA women football of the year award. In August 2018 she was named to the Fijian team for the 2018 OFC Women's Nations Cup. In 2019 she trialled for French club Stade De Reims.

She captained the team for the 2022 OFC women's nations cup.

Notes

References

1993 births
Living people
Women's association football midfielders
Fijian women's footballers
Fiji women's international footballers